DuBois-Deyo House is a historic home located at Rosendale in Ulster County, New York.  It was built about 1750 and is composed of two sections.  The main block is a two-story, four-by-two-bay stone and frame building with a two-story frame rear wing.  Also on the property is a garage dated to about 1890.

The house was purchased by artist Carolee Schneemann in 1964 and became her primary residence until her death in 2019. Many of her artworks were created and filmed in the house, including the film Fuses.

It was listed on the National Register of Historic Places in 1994.

References

Houses on the National Register of Historic Places in New York (state)
Houses completed in 1750
Houses in Ulster County, New York
National Register of Historic Places in Ulster County, New York